Westview High School is the name of several high schools in the United States:

 Westview High School (Arizona),  in Avondale, Arizona
 Westview High School (Beaverton, Oregon), near Portland, Oregon
 Westview High School (Indiana), in LaGrange County, Indiana
 Westview High School (San Diego), in San Diego, California
 Westview High School (Idaho Falls), in Idaho Falls, Idaho
 Westview High School (Tennessee), in Martin, Tennessee